Archigraptis strigifera is a species of moth of the family Tortricidae. It is found in Malaysia (Sabah) and Indonesia.

References

Moths described in 1988
Tortricini
Moths of Malaysia
Moths of Indonesia